The twenty-third season of the American animated television series The Simpsons began airing on Fox on September 25, 2011, and ended May 20, 2012.  The showrunner for the season was Al Jean, with three episodes ran with Matt Selman, one of those he also wrote himself.  The show's 500th episode, "At Long Last Leave", aired February 19, 2012.

Episodes

Production
The season premiere episode "The Falcon and the D'ohman" features a reference to the previous episode of the series, the twenty-second season finale "The Ned-Liest Catch" that aired May 22, 2011. In that episode, the characters Ned Flanders and Edna Krabappel started dating. The episode ends with Homer and Marge Simpson giving the viewers a link to the official The Simpsons website, TheSimpsons.com, and encouraging them to go on the website and vote over the summer of 2011 on whether Ned and Edna should stay together. Executive producer Al Jean said in an interview that the writers decided it would not be interesting for them to do another episode where a relationship ended, and they thought it would be interesting "to see what people think, the Internet certainly has a lot of opinion on the show, might as well have them have their say". When asked why the writers thought Ned and Edna were the right characters for a cliffhanger like this, Jean said that "In life, unusual things happen. People couple together in ways you would not expect, and he's single and she's single. We thought it would be funny, the fact that they both have these connections to the Simpsons but they never really met or if they have met it was minimal." The result of the poll were revealed in "The Falcon and the D'ohman". According to Jean, the poll was "very strong in one direction". He assured in an interview before the result was presented that the poll was authentic and the writers would not undo the viewers' decision, and added that "What our fans have joined together, let no writer tear asunder."

Cancellation threat
20th Century Fox Television released a statement on October 4, 2011, saying that "23 seasons in, The Simpsons is as creatively vibrant as ever and beloved by millions around the world. We believe this brilliant series can and should continue, but we cannot produce future seasons under its current financial model. We are hopeful that we can reach an agreement with the voice cast that allows The Simpsons to go on entertaining audiences with original episodes for many years to come." One of the problems was that The Simpsons was possibly worth more cancelled than on the air. A 17-year-old syndication deal with local TV stations prohibits Fox from selling the show to cable networks. As long as The Simpsons still produces new episodes, Fox cannot break this deal. In the meantime, cable networks have grown to become just as big a market as the local TV stations. Another consideration was that Fox's parent company News Corporation was having meetings discussing the possibility of a cable channel that would only air The Simpsons episodes. Analysts consider a cancellation and subsequent second-run deal that includes cable networks to be worth $750 million. On this issue, Al Jean commented in an interview with TV Guide that "It's a big company, and there are definitely people whose interests would have been better served by ending it. Those interests were superseded because we're still valuable to the network in terms of our ratings."

For the negotiations, the studio requested that the cast members accept a 45% cut of their salaries so that more seasons could be produced after season 23, or else that season would be the series' last. The actors were willing to take a pay cut, but wanted a percentage of the back-end payments instead. At one point, Harry Shearer even offered a 70% pay cut in exchange for back-end percentages, but the studio was unwilling to make any deal involving back-end percentages. In the end, the studio and the actors reached a deal, in which the actors would take a pay cut of 30%, down to just over $300,000 per episode, renewing the show to its 25th season. As well as the voice actors, everybody involved in the show took a pay cut. This included the animators, writers, post-production crew and even Jean himself. The further use of digital animation also saved money, as the animation of the show became more efficient.

Ratings
The season premiere episode "The Falcon and the D'ohman" originally aired on the Fox network in the United States on September 25, 2011. It was watched by approximately 8.08 million people during this broadcast. It received a 3.9 Nielsen rating in the demographic for adults aged 18–49, and a ten percent share. The ratings  were up three percent compared to the last season's premiere. The Simpsons became the second highest-rated program in the 18–49 demographic in Fox's Animation Domination lineup that night, finishing before The Cleveland Show and American Dad! but after Family Guy. The Simpsons was, however, the most-watched show in the lineup in terms of total viewers.

During the twenty-third season, the cost of a 30-second advertising spot would be $254,260 in an original broadcast. It is the fifth-most expensive show for advertisers on Fox, with only American Idol, The X Factor, Glee and Family Guy being more expensive.

References

Bibliography

Simpsons season 23
2011 American television seasons
2012 American television seasons